The 2007 Food City 500 was the fifth race of the 2007 NASCAR Nextel Cup season, and was run on Sunday, March 25, 2007, at Bristol Motor Speedway in Bristol, Tennessee. This marked the debut of the Car of Tomorrow.

Overview 
The race was historic as this marked the competitive debut of NASCAR's Car of Tomorrow vehicle template, which was tested on February 28 at this facility, as the test was extended due to an impending rainstorm and three sessions were held in one day, including a nighttime session.  Because of the success in those tests, NASCAR considered making the CoT permanent in the 2008 season.  Additionally, in all CoT events, two brands will switch models, as Dodge will use the Avenger and Chevrolet will utilize the Impala brand.

The event was the last to be run on the original concrete surface as resurfacing started following the race, using specially designed resurfacers that will lay a new concrete surface for the Sharpie 500 event in August.  In addition, the 36-degree turns will be altered to progressive banking.

The race was also the last for the Top 35 teams in the 2006 Owner's points to be "locked in" for the race.  Starting with the next race, the Goody's Cool Orange 500, the current standings was used.

Jeff Gordon won the pole. Dale Jarrett, who had used a provisional the past four races, qualified 30th. A. J. Allmendinger and Jeremy Mayfield made their season debuts after failing to qualify for the previous four races (qualifying 43rd and 23rd, respectively).

Failed to qualify

The following drivers failed to qualify:

Kevin Lepage (#37), David Reutimann (#00), Michael Waltrip (#55), Joe Nemechek (#13), Johnny Sauter (#70), and Paul Menard (#15)
Withdrew: Chad Chaffin (#34)

Of these drivers, Nemechek (who missed his first race in over five years when he was released by Travis Carter because of a lack of sponsorship in 2002) and possibly Sauter could still end up locked into the top-35 after this race, despite missing this race (both had made the previous four races, but drive for new teams with no previous owner points to fall back on). With the car owner points provision for failing to qualify, however, both the Ginn #13 and the Haas CNC #70 remained in the top 35 in owner points, which meant both teams were awarded exemptions for the next race.

The other teams are guaranteed to be out of the top 35.

The #37 team has now missed four of the first five points races, Reutimann and Menard have missed two races, and Waltrip has missed four straight races.

Race Day

The race, despite the introduction of the CoT, was a typical Bristol affair, with 15 caution flags for 90 laps. Tony Stewart, starting from the fourth position, looked to have the car to beat all day. However, during a caution with 211 laps left, Stewart experienced a fuel pressure malfunction, and would finish 35th. The lead was inherited by his Joe Gibbs Racing teammate, Denny Hamlin. Hamlin would hold the lead until with 16 laps to go, Kyle Busch stole the lead from the sophomore in the #5 Kellogg's Chevy for Hendrick Motorsports. It appeared as though Kyle would sail off with his first win of 2007, but a spin by rookie David Ragan set up a green-white-checkered finish with Hendrick Motorsports holding the first two spots. Kyle Busch was second, with teammate Jeff Gordon behind him, and the Richard Childress Racing cars of Jeff Burton and Kevin Harvick behind them.
That would not last long however, as on the restart, Kyle spun the tires, allowing Jeff to inch under him; however, Jeff Burton steered his #31 Chevrolet to the outside of Jeff Gordon and attempted to chase down Kyle. Jeff Burton would clear Gordon just as Kyle Busch took the white flag, and would chase down Kyle during the final lap, narrowly losing by half-a-car length at the start-finish line.

Busch's victory was a historic one in many ways. Not only it being the first victory for the Car of Tomorrow, but it was also the 156th win for Hendrick Motorsports, the 600th victory for Chevrolet in NASCAR, and the 61st victory for the Chevrolet Impala nameplate, the last one coming in 1964 when Wendell Scott became the first African-American to win in NASCAR. The first win for the Impala came in 1959 when Bob Welborn won in Daytona.  In a post-race ceremony, former 12-time Bristol winner and current NASCAR on Fox commentator Darrell Waltrip, who dropped the green flag for this race, jack-hammered a piece of the original concrete to begin the reconstruction of the track.

Race results

References

External links
Complete race results 
Championship standings 

Food City 500
Food City 500
NASCAR races at Bristol Motor Speedway
March 2007 sports events in the United States